Centennial Park is a TECO Line streetcar station in Tampa, Florida. The station has one track and one side platform on the north side of 8th Avenue. It is the first station on the streetcar and was the location of the opening ceremony of the first train. There is parking for the station just north.

Within walking distance
Centennial Park
Ybor City State Museum
Columbia Restaurant

See also

Light rail in the United States
List of streetcar systems in the United States
Streetcars in North America
Transportation in Florida

References

External links
 Official Website
 Station from Google Maps Street View

TECO Line Streetcar System stations
Railway stations in the United States opened in 2002
2002 establishments in Florida